Saint Elvis may refer to:

 Saint Ailbe of Emly ( 5th century), whose name was often anglicized as 'Elvis'
 St Elvis, a parish in southern Wales named in his honour

See also
 Elvis (disambiguation)